Lytton is a village of about 250 residents in southern British Columbia, Canada, on the east side of the Fraser River and primarily the south side of the Thompson River, where it flows southwesterly into the Fraser. The community includes the Village of Lytton and the surrounding community of the Lytton First Nation, whose name for the place is Camchin, also spelled Kumsheen ("river meeting").

During heat waves, Lytton is often the hottest spot in Canada despite its location north of 50°N in latitude. This is the highest temperature ever recorded north of 45°N and higher than the all-time records for Europe and South America. The next day (June 30), a wildfire swept through the valley, destroying the majority of the town.

The Lytton area has been inhabited by the First Nations people for over 10,000 years. It was one of the earliest locations occupied by non-Indigenous settlers in the Southern Interior of British Columbia. The town was founded during the Fraser Canyon Gold Rush of 1858–59, when it was known as "The Forks."

History
Lytton was on the route of the Fraser Canyon Gold Rush in 1858. The same year, it was named after Edward Bulwer-Lytton, the British Colonial Secretary and a novelist.  For many years, Lytton was a stop on major transportation routes, namely, the River Trail beginning in 1858, Cariboo Wagon Road in 1862, the Canadian Pacific Railway in the 1880s, the Cariboo Highway in the 1920s, and the Trans Canada Highway in the 1950s. The town is much less important since the construction of the Coquihalla Highway in 1987, which uses a more direct route to the BC Interior.

In 2015, Lytton was featured on the CBC television show Still Standing with host Jonny Harris.

2021 wildfire and destruction

All villagers were ordered to evacuate. Local MP Brad Vis said 90% of the village burned down. Two people died.

In the year since the fire, only a quarter of the properties were cleared of ash and debris.  There was incessant wrangling between local residents who wanted to restore buildings and power immediately, and the local council who wanted fire-prevention standards in place. Coupled with inadequate insurance payouts and local record-breaking floods, residents were running out of time to restore the village.  They were further hampered when another wildfire took out six residences across the river in July 2022.

Name origin
Novelist Edward Bulwer-Lytton was a friend and contemporary of Charles Dickens and was one of the pioneers of the historical novel, exemplified by his most popular work, The Last Days of Pompeii. He is best remembered today for the opening line to the novel Paul Clifford, which begins "It was a dark and stormy night..." and is considered by some to be the worst opening sentence in the English language. Bulwer-Lytton is also responsible for sayings such as "The pen is mightier than the sword" from his play Richelieu. Though he was a popular author in the 19th century, fewer people today are aware of his prodigious body of literature, which spans many genres. In the 21st century, he is best known as the namesake for the Bulwer-Lytton Fiction Contest (BLFC), sponsored annually by the English Department at San Jose State University, which challenges entrants "to compose the opening sentence to the worst of all possible novels."

In 1858, Governor James Douglas named the town after Bulwer-Lytton "as a merited compliment and mark of respect."  Bulwer-Lytton served as Colonial Secretary. As governor of the then-colony, Douglas would have reported to him.

Lord Lytton literary debate
On August 30, 2008, the Village of Lytton invited Henry Lytton-Cobbold, the great-great-great grandson of Edward Bulwer-Lytton, to defend the great man's honour by debating Professor Scott Rice, the sponsor of the BLFC, on the literary and political legacies of his great ancestor. The debate received wide media coverage including The Globe and Mail, The New York Times, The Guardian, CBC's As It Happens, and many local and regional media outlets. The debate was moderated by Mike McArdell of Global TV. Lytton-Cobbold provided a spirited and crowd-inspiring defence of his ancestor, and despite a factual and well-researched presentation by Rice, Lytton-Cobbold emerged as the crowd favourite by a wide margin. In the end, Rice begrudgingly admitted to an admiration of Bulwer-Lytton. This event was held as part of the Village of Lytton's BC150 celebrations, which marked the 150th anniversary of the date that the community received its name, in addition to the province-wide celebration of the establishment of the original Colony of British Columbia on August 2, 1858.

Demographics 

Another 1,700 people in the immediate area live in rural areas and on reserves of the neighbouring six Nlaka'pamux communities.

802 members out of 1,970 registered members of the Lytton First Nation live on reserves immediately adjacent to the municipality.

Climate
Lytton experiences an inland warm-summer mediterranean climate (Csb), using the -3°C isotherm, or a dry-summer continental climate (Dsb), using the 0°C isotherm. During summer heat waves, Lytton is often the hottest spot in Canada, despite its location north of 50°N in latitude. This occurred after having already broken records multiple times during the previous days of that heat wave. This is the world's highest temperature ever recorded north of the 50th parallel, the highest temperature ever in the United States or Canada recorded outside of the Southwestern United States, and higher than the record-high temperatures ever recorded for Europe or South America.

Before the 2021 heat wave occurred, Lytton, along with the nearby community of Lillooet, shared the second-highest temperature ever recorded in Canada. On July 16 and 17, 1941, the temperature reached a then-record  on both days in both communities. While reporting on the new records in 2021, Global News noted that the official Environment Canada weather station is located in the shade and is about  cooler than the rest of the village. Hot summer temperatures are made more tolerable by low humidity. The heat can be intense under usually clear skies and sunlight, or by the valley's radiant slopes. Forest fires are not uncommon during the summer.

Lytton's climate is also characterised by relatively short and mild winters (although average monthly temperatures in December and January are just below freezing), with Pacific maritime influence during the winter ensuring thick cloud cover much of the time. Cold snaps originating from arctic outflow occur from time to time, but tend to be short-lived, and mountains to the north usually block extreme cold from penetrating the Fraser Canyon.

Lytton receives  of annual precipitation on average, making it much drier than communities to the south but certainly wetter than some of the driest spots in the BC interior, such as Ashcroft, Kamloops, Spences Bridge, and Osoyoos. It has the driest summers in the interior of British Columbia and one of the driest summers of all places in Canada. Maximum precipitation occurs in the cooler months, with late autumn and early winter constituting the wettest time of the year.

Vegetation
Open coniferous forests of Douglas fir and ponderosa pine dominate the slopes around Lytton. Some black cottonwood is scattered among the conifers. Bunchgrass dominates the forest floor. Non-native trees cultivated in Lytton include black locust and Manitoba Maple.

Transportation

Lytton lies on the Trans-Canada Highway as well as both the Canadian Pacific and Canadian National Railways. The Canadian National Railway crosses both the Fraser and Thompson Rivers on two large steel bridges at Lytton.

Highway 12 runs north from Lytton  to Lillooet, connecting there to Highway 99, which leads southwest to Pemberton and Whistler and beyond to Vancouver, and northeast to its terminus at Lower Hat Creek (Carquile) at a junction with Highway 97 just north of Cache Creek.

The Lytton Ferry, a free reaction ferry, crosses the Fraser River at Lytton. On the river's west side are Indian reserve communities of the Lytton First Nation and the Stein Valley Nlaka'pamux Heritage Park via trails from the confluence of the Stein River with the Fraser. From the ferry, a route known as the West Side Road leads through the Nesikep and Texas Creek areas to Lillooet and BC Highway 99; the route south from the ferry is much more difficult but leads to North Bend-Boston Bar. When the ferry is out of service because of ice or low water levels on the Fraser River, pedestrian access is available via a walkway on the Canadian National Railway bridge crossing the river.

Via Rail's Canadian and the Rocky Mountaineer pass through Lytton but do not make any stops. Via Rail's closest stops are Ashcroft,  to the north, and North Bend/Boston Bar,  to the south.

Municipal

The mayor of Lytton is Denise O'Connor, who was first elected in the 2022 municipal election.

Lytton is a corporate entity created under the Community Charter. Elections for Village Council are held every four years. The current Council comprises the following members:

Mayor Denise O'Connor
Councillor Nonie McCann
Councillor Jessoa Lightfoot
Councillor Melissa Michell
Councillor Jen Thoss

Provincial

Originally part of the Lillooet provincial riding, then part of Yale-Lillooet, Lytton is now in the provincial riding of Fraser-Nicola, represented  by Jackie Tegart of the BC Liberals, who first won in the 2013 election.

Federal
Federally, the town is in the riding of Mission—Matsqui—Fraser Canyon and is currently represented by Brad Vis of the Conservative Party of Canada, who was first elected in the 2019 elections.

Economy
The single main employer in the village produced forestry products and was forced to close because of market uncertainties in 2007.

Lytton is the self-proclaimed "River Rafting Capital of Canada" with Kumsheen Rafting Resort now the largest employer in the area.  A provincial campsite, Skihist Provincial Park, adjacent to the Trans-Canada Highway six kilometres north of the village, has space for tenting as well as RVs and enjoys one of the few views available of Skihist Mountain, the highest summit of the Lillooet Ranges, across the Fraser to the west of Lytton. The privately run Jade Springs Restaurant, also east of the village on the Trans-Canada, burned down in the fire of June 2021 but offered a full service campground which hopefully will open again once clean up of the Village and area is completed and services are restored.

Education
School District 74 operated Lytton Elementary School which was lost in 2021 Lytton Creek Wildfire. and Kumsheen Secondary School (Kumsheen ShchEma-meet School).

Stein Valley Nlakapamux School is a registered member with the B.C. First Nations Schools Association. The School is mandated to provide instruction and courses approved by the B.C. Ministry of Education and BC Independent Schools.

References

External links

lytton.ca

Villages in British Columbia
Populated places in the Thompson-Nicola Regional District
Populated places on the Fraser River
Thompson Country
Fraser Canyon
Populated places established in 1858
1858 establishments in the British Empire